The 1999 Tulsa Golden Hurricane football team represented the University of Tulsa during the 1999 NCAA Division I-A football season. In their 12th year under head coach David Rader, the Golden Hurricane compiled a 2–9 record, 1–6 against conference opponents, and finished in last place in the Western Athletic Conference.  The team's statistical leaders included quarterback Josh Blankenship with 1,416 passing yards, John Mosley with 873 rushing yards, and Damon Savage with 752 receiving yards.

Schedule

Roster

References

Tulsa
Tulsa Golden Hurricane football seasons
Tulsa Golden Hurricane football